Rachel Rachel may refer to:

 Rachel, Rachel, a 1968 American film
 Rachel, Rachel (All Grown Up!), an episode of All Grown Up!
 Rachel Rachel (band), a musical group active in the early 1990s